Kim Do-hoon (born September 15, 1998) is a South Korean actor.

Early life and education
After graduating from Kaywom Arts High School, Kim enrolled in Chung-Ang University's Department of Theater and Film.

Filmography

Film

Television series

Web series

Awards and nominations

References

1998 births
Living people
South Korean male film actors
South Korean male television actors
21st-century South Korean male actors
South Korean male web series actors
Chung-Ang University alumni